Jean Eugène Bataillon (22 October 1864 – 1 November 1953) was a French zoologist who studied embryology, fertilization and development.

Bataillon was born in Annoire, Jura, son of a stonemason and chose not to follow studies leading to a religious career and went to the Collège d’Arbois and studied philosophy while teaching at the Belfort lycée. He then studied in Lyons studying under Fernand Arloing. He became an assistant in zoology at the University of Lyons in 1887 and trained under Laurent Chabry. His doctoral thesis was on the metamorphosis of amphibians (1891). He then joined the faculty as a lecturer in zoology at Lyons and moved to Dijon the next year. In 1903 he became the first professor of general biology in 1903. He discovered the phenomenon of traumatic parthenogenesis in amphibians. Bataillon injected fluids (saline, sugar and blood serum) into the eggs of amphibians and fishes could trigger the activation and cleavage of the egg. The Embryo however aborted in his early experiments. He initially thought it was osmotic pressure that was the trigger but later found that it could be reduced to just puncturing them with platinum stylets. He was able to produce normal parthenogenetic larvae in Rana temporaria in 1910. One of his students was Chou Su who returned to China to teach zoology. Bataillon retired in 1932 and moved to Montpellier.

References 

1864 births
1953 deaths
French zoologists
Developmental biologists